The SEAT 124 Sport is a two-door coupé car built by the Spanish manufacturer SEAT between 1970 and 1975, having sold 23,611 units when its production ceased.

The car was presented for the first time at the 1970 Barcelona Motor Show and it was built in Spain under license from Fiat as it had been identical to the Fiat 124 Sport Coupé. It was launched in order to meet the rising local market demand for sports cars next to offerings coming not only from other car makers – like the Authi Mini C 1275, the Alpine A110, the Renault 8TS and the Simca 1000 Rallye GT – but also SEAT itself with the SEAT 850 Sport Coupé and Spider models. 

Power was provided by double camshaft (biárbol) engines, with a displacement of either 1,608 cc (1600, FC-00) or 1,756 cc (1800, FC-02). Both engine variants were linked to a 5-speed gearbox, a transmission introduced for the first time in a model on the Spanish market. The first series produced from 1970 to 1973 was equivalent to the BC series of Fiat's version, and used 1608 cc engines provided by Fiat itself. The second series from 1973 onwards was a direct copy of the CC model, with both the 1592 and 1756 cc engines.

References

124 Sport
1970s cars
Cars introduced in 1970
Cars of Spain
Coupés
Cars discontinued in 1975